I-394, I394, or i394 may refer to:

Interstate 394
Illinois Route 394
IEEE 1394